Acholla is a genus of assassin bugs in the family Reduviidae. There are at least three described species in Acholla, found in North America.

Species
These three species belong to the genus Acholla.
 Acholla ampliata Stål, 1872
 Acholla multispinosa (De Geer, 1773)
 Acholla tabida (Stål, 1862)

References

Further reading

 
 
 
 
 
 
 

Reduviidae